The Yungyuele (Üngüöle) is a river in Sakha Republic (Yakutia), Russia. There are no settlements near its banks. 

There are rocks on the banks of the river with petroglyphs depicting deer and human figures which had ritual significance in the culture of the Evenks.

Course
The Yungyuele is the 17th tributary of the Aldan regarding length and basin area. Its source is located on the northern slopes of the Aldan Highlands, at the southern end of Yakutia. Its valley along the foothills of the Aldan Highlands is deep and narrow, flanked by rocky crags. 
There is almost no floodplain, except for the final stretch of its course where the Yungyuele makes a wide bend towards the north and joins the right bank of the Aldan  from its confluence with the Lena. The village of Chagda is located very close by, in the facing bank of the Aldan.

The river is frozen between October and May.

See also
List of rivers of Russia

References

External links 
 Рубим лес - кормим животных: Комментарий Минэкологии Якутии на публикацию сетевого издания «Якутия.Инфо» (Yakutia.Info)
 Geography - Yakutia Organized

Rivers of the Sakha Republic
Aldan Highlands